Death at Broadcasting House, also known as Death at a Broadcast, is a 1934 British mystery film directed by Reginald Denham and starring Ian Hunter, Austin Trevor, Henry Kendall, and Jack Hawkins.

Novel
The original plot comes from a novel of the same name, set in what was then the mysterious world of radio in what was then the BBC's new broadcasting centre, Broadcasting House. It was written in 1934 by Val Gielgud – brother of John Gielgud and at that time the BBC's Head of Productions –  and "Holt Marvell" - actually Eric Maschwitz, a lyricist and writer for films and the BBC.

Film
In the same year, it was made into the film, directed by Reginald Denham, with Ian Hunter (best known as King Richard I in the 1938 Adventures of Robin Hood) as the detective, Donald Wolfit as the murder victim, and Val Gielgud himself as the drama producer, Julian Caird. The film sticks closely to the plot of the book, but is lighter in tone, and capitalizes on the glamour of broadcasting by including a number of cameo appearances by radio stars, among them Hannen Swaffer, Gillie Potter, Elisabeth Welch and Percival Mackey. During the investigation, the detective uses a recording of the radio programme during which the murder occurred, and he refers to the "Blattnerphone", one of the first sound-recording machines, and one of which had actually been installed at Broadcasting House in March 1932.

Cast
 Ian Hunter as Detective Inspector Gregory 
 Austin Trevor as Leopold Dryden 
 Lilian Oldland as Joan Dryden
 Henry Kendall as Rodney Fleming 
 Val Gielgud as Julian Caird 
 Peter Haddon as Guy Bannister 
 Betty Ann Davies as Poppy Levine 
 Jack Hawkins as Herbert Evans 
 Donald Wolfit as Sydney Parsons 
 Robert Rendel as Sir Herbert Farquharson
 Bruce Lester as Peter Ridgewell

References

External links
 

1934 films
British mystery films
1934 mystery films
Films based on British novels
Films directed by Reginald Denham
Films set in London
British black-and-white films
1930s English-language films
1930s British films